Benazir Berends Charles (born July 9, 1992) is a beauty pageant titleholder who was crowned Miss Bonaire 2010 and is expected to represent the Dutch public body in the 2011 Miss World pageant. She also placed in the Top 15 at Miss Intercontinental 2010.

Early life
An avid sportswoman, Charles enjoys scuba diving, cycling and canoeing. She speaks Dutch, English and Papiamento.

Miss Bonaire 2010

Miss Intercontinental 2010
Charles competed in Miss Intercontinental 2010, held on November 6, 2010 in Punta Cana, Dominican Republic and became one of the Top 15 semifinalists, 8th runner up of the competition.

Miss World 2011
Charles also competed in the 2011 Miss World pageant with 113 other contestants, broadcast live from London, the United Kingdom on November 7, 2011 where she became one of the Top 24 of Sportswoman and Top 30 of Beauty with a Purpose in the competition.

Miss Globe 2012
Benazir also represented Bonaire in the Miss Globe pageant held on November 10, 2012 in Tirana, Albania.

References 

1992 births
Living people
Bonaire beauty pageant winners
Miss World 2011 delegates
Papiamento-speaking people
Dutch people of Pakistani descent